Masaba (Lumasaaba), sometimes known as Gisu (Lugisu) after one of its dialects, is a Bantu language spoken by more than two million people in East Africa. The Gisu dialect in eastern Uganda is mutually intelligible with Bukusu, spoken by ethnic Luhya in western Kenya. Masaba is the local name of Mount Elgon and the name of the son of the ancestor of the Gisu tribe. Like other Bantu languages, Lumasaba nouns are divided into several sets of noun classes. These are similar to the genders in Germanic and Romance languages, except that instead of the usual two or three, there are around eighteen different noun classes. The language has a quite complex verb morphology.

Varieties
Varieties of Masaba are as follows:
Gisu (Lugisu)
Kisu
Bukusu (Lubukusu; ethnic Luhya)
Syan
Tachoni (Lutachoni; ethnic Luhya)
Dadiri (Ludadiri)
Buya (Lubuya)

Dadiri is spoken in the north, Gisu in the center, and Buya in the center and south of Masaba territory in Uganda. Bukusu is spoken in Kenya, separated from ethnic Masaba by Nilotic languages on the border.

Phonology
See Bukusu dialect for details of one variety of Masaba.

Consonants

Vowels
Masaba has a basic 5-vowel system consisting of /i, e, a, o, u/.

References

Bibliography 
Brown, Gillian (1972) Phonological Rules and Dialectal Variation: A study of the phonology of Lumasaaba

External links
Kulomba Kwikumutikinyi Portions of the Book of Common Prayer in Masaba (1907) digitized by Richard Mammana and Charles Wohlers
http://open-chapel.com/scripture/language-preservation/lumasaaba-language-study/ Learning Lumasaaba by Catherine Mabongor

Languages of Uganda
Great Lakes Bantu languages